The 2015 BAIC Motor China Open was a professional ranking snooker tournament, that took place between 30 March and 5 April 2015 at the Beijing University Students' Gymnasium in Beijing, China. It was the tenth ranking event of the 2014–15 season.

Ding Junhui was the defending champion, but he lost 5–6 against Gary Wilson in the semi-finals.

Mark Selby defeated Wilson 10–2 to win his sixth career ranking title, his second of the season, and his first China Open title after being twice runner-up (in 2011 and 2013). The tournament was Wilson's first ranking event final.

Prize fund
The breakdown of prize money for this year is shown below:

Winner: £85,000
Runner-up: £35,000
Semi-final: £21,000
Quarter-final: £12,500
Last 16: £8,000
Last 32: £6,500
Last 64: £3,000

Televised highest break: £2,000
Total: £478,000

Wildcard round
These matches were played in Beijing on 30 March 2015.

Main draw

Final

Qualifying
These matches were held on 14 and 15 February 2015 at the Barnsley Metrodome in Barnsley, England. All matches were best of 9 frames.

Century breaks

Qualifying stage centuries

 134  Robert Milkins
 132, 111  Dechawat Poomjaeng
 128  Zhou Yuelong
 128  Dave Harold
 125  Mark Williams
 124  Ronnie O'Sullivan
 123  Stuart Bingham
 122  Barry Pinches
 120, 108  Liang Wenbo
 120  Jimmy Robertson
 117  Luca Brecel

 115  David Grace
 112  John Higgins
 111  Alfie Burden
 111  Judd Trump
 110  Chris Wakelin
 109  Fergal O'Brien
 104  Stephen Maguire
 101  Liam Highfield
 100  Joe Swail
 100  Ryan Day

Televised stage centuries

 145, 136, 131, 126, 106  Mark Selby
 143, 113  Shaun Murphy
 138, 124  Barry Hawkins
 133  Marco Fu
 132, 112  Robin Hull
 132  Daniel Wells
 129, 128, 113, 106, 103, 101  Kurt Maflin
 128  Robert Milkins
 127, 101, 100  Judd Trump
 123  Matthew Selt

 120  Mark Davis
 116  David Morris
 114, 101  Gary Wilson
 114  John Higgins
 112  Graeme Dott
 106  Andrew Higginson
 105, 103  Ding Junhui
 105  Michael White
 103  Dominic Dale
 102, 100  Jamie Jones

References

China Open (snooker)
China Open
Open (snooker)
Sports competitions in Beijing